is a Japanese professional shogi player ranked 7-dan.

Early life
Ōhashi was born in Shingū, Wakayama on September 22, 1992. He learned how to play shogi as 
fourth-grade elementary school student, and entered the Japan Shogi Association's apprentice school at the rank of 6-kyū as a student of shogi professional Kazuharu Shoshi in September 2006.

Takahashi was promoted to 3-dan in 2010 and obtained professional status and the rank of 4-dan in October 2016 after finishing runner-up in the 59th 3-dan League (April 2016 September 2016) with a record of 12 wins and 6 losses.

Shogi professional
Takahashi finished runner-up in the 46th  in 2015, losing to Tatsuya Sugai 2 games to 1. Takahashi was still ranked an apprentice professional 3-dan at the time, and won the first game of the match before Sugai came back to win the last two.

In October of the same year, he defeated Hirotaka Kajiura 2 games to none to win the 8th .

Promotion history
The promotion history for Ōhashi is as follows:
 6-kyū: September 2006
 3-dan: October 2010
 4-dan: October 1, 2016
 5-dan: July 31, 2019
 6-dan: October 23, 2019
 7-dan: February 8, 2023

Titles and other championships
Ōhashi has yet to appear in a major title match, but he has won two non-major title championships.

Awards and honors
Ōhashi received the Japan Shogi Association Annual Shogi Award for "Best New Player" for the 20182019 Shogi Year. He won the Kōzō Masuda Award for developing the Yōryū Fourth File Rook opening in 2020.

References

External links
ShogiHub: Professional Player Info · Oohashi, Takahiro

Japanese shogi players
Living people
Professional shogi players
Professional shogi players from Wakayama Prefecture
1992 births
Kakogawa Seiryū